Robert Pinckney Dunlap (August 17, 1794 – October 20, 1859) was the 11th Governor of Maine and a U.S. Representative from Maine.

Biography
Born in Brunswick (in modern-day Maine, then a part of Massachusetts), Dunlap was educated by private tutors. He graduated from Bowdoin College, Brunswick, Maine, in 1815. His father, John Dunlap, was born in Dracut, Massachusetts in 1738 and was as a Massachusetts Bay Colonial Militia Captain who served during the French and Indian War, while his grandfather, Rev. Robert Dunlap, was born in 1715 in County Antrim, Ireland and was a Presbyterian minister trained at the University of Edinburgh. He studied law, was admitted to the bar in 1818, and commenced practice in Brunswick.

Dunlap served as a member of the Maine House of Representatives from 1821 to 1823.
He served as president of the board of overseers of Bowdoin College from 1821 until his death.
He served as member of the state militia, and was delegated to receive General Lafayette when he visited Maine in 1824.

Dunlap served in the State Senate 1824-1828 and 1831–1833, including three years as Senate President, in 1827, 1828, and 1831.  He is, as of 2020, the only person to serve non-consecutive terms as Senate President.  In between his Senate terms, he was a member of the Executive Council of Maine.  He served four one-year terms as Governor of Maine from 1834 to 1838.

Dunlap was elected as a Democrat to the Twenty-eighth and Twenty-ninth Congresses (March 4, 1843 – March 3, 1847).

He served as chairman of the Committee on Public Expenditures (Twenty-ninth Congress).
He served as collector of customs in Portland, Maine, in 1848-49, and postmaster of Brunswick in 1853-57.

Death and burial
Dunlap died in Brunswick, Maine, October 20, 1859. He was interred in Pine Grove Cemetery.

References

National Governors Association profile

External links 
 

1794 births
1859 deaths
American people of Scotch-Irish descent
Democratic Party members of the Maine House of Representatives
Presidents of the Maine Senate
Democratic Party Maine state senators
Democratic Party governors of Maine
Bowdoin College alumni
Politicians from Brunswick, Maine
Members of the Executive Council of Maine
Democratic Party members of the United States House of Representatives from Maine
19th-century American politicians